William Henry Langdon (September 25, 1873 – August 10, 1939) was an American banker, lawyer and Associate Justice of the California Supreme Court from January 4, 1927, to August 10, 1939.

Education and early career
Langdon was born near Dublin, Alameda County, California, to Irish immigrants William and Annie Langdon. Following the death of Langdon's father in 1875, his mother ran a cattle and wheat ranch. Langdon was educated in the public schools and Hayward High School. He graduated from the California State Normal School to become a teacher, while also studying law in the offices of future Supreme Court Justice John E. Richards. In 1896, Langdon was admitted to the state Bar. Langdon served as vice principal and principal at schools in San Leandro, Fresno, and San Francisco, eventually becoming the city's school superintendent in 1902.

Legal and judicial career
In November 1905, city voters elected Langdon as district attorney of San Francisco, and in 1907 re-elected him to a second term. A popular district attorney, Langdon was nominated by the Independence League as its choice for governor in the 1906 elections. Langdon's presence as a strong third party candidacy won over 14 percent of the vote, proving to be a spoiler vote in a tight race between Democrat Theodore A. Bell and Republican James Gillett. In 1907, one year after the aftermath of the San Francisco earthquake, Langdon carried out the successful prosecutions both of Mayor Eugene Schmitz and political machine operator Abe Ruef for bribery and extortion, along with special assistants Francis J. Heney, Hiram Johnson and Matt Sullivan.

After his tenure as district attorney, Langdon entered banking, serving with several banks around Modesto and managing the property his wife had inherited from her first husband.

In 1913, he served as the head of the State Board of Education.

In 1915, he reentered law when Governor Hiram Johnson appointed Langdon a judge of the Superior Court of Stanislaus County. In December 1918, Governor William Stephens appointed Langdon presiding judge of the newly minted  First District, Second Division, of the California Court of Appeal. In 1920, Langdon was elected to a full term.

In November 1926, Langdon won election to a 12-year term as an associate justice of the Supreme Court of California, where he served the next nineteen years until his death in 1939. Langdon filled the unexpired term of William P. Lawlor, who died in office in July 1926, and whose seat was filled for three months by the appointment of Jeremiah F. Sullivan. From 1930 until 1939, treatise author Bernard E. Witkin served as Langdon's law clerk. In October 1939, the vacancy in Langdon's seat was filled by Governor Culbert Olson with the appointment of Phil S. Gibson.

Among Langdon's notable cases is his 1930 dissent in the denial of a commuted sentence of convicted double murderer Ernest A. Dias. The majority of the court upheld the death penalty, but in dissent Langdon urged the governor to grant executive clemency on the basis of Dias' mental incompetence at the time of the killings.

Personal life
On April 20, 1908, he married Stanford-trained school teacher Myrtie Conneau McHenry (December 2, 1878 – August 18, 1959), a wealthy widow from Modesto, California. They had one son: Lawton William Langdon (April 15, 1913 – September 23, 1960). His wife, Myrtie, also had two children from her first marriage: Lois Ann ("Annie") Langdon (Moran) (January 28, 1910 – May 11, 1973) and Merl McHenry (December 3, 1903 – January 3, 1994).

See also
 List of justices of the Supreme Court of California

Footnotes

References
 Leonard, John William (1911). Who's Who in Finance and Banking: A Biographical Dictionary of Contemporaries, 1920–1922. New York, NY: Joseph & Sefton. p. 402.

External links
 William H. Langdon. California Supreme Court Historical Society.
 
 

1873 births
1939 deaths
Justices of the Supreme Court of California
District attorneys in California
American bankers
United States Independence Party politicians
People from Alameda County, California
California State University alumni
U.S. state supreme court judges admitted to the practice of law by reading law
Superior court judges in the United States
Lawyers from San Francisco
20th-century American judges
20th-century American lawyers
San Francisco Unified School District superintendents